Tupo Fa'amasino (born April 13, 1966 in Apia) is a former Samoan rugby union player. He played as a centre.

Career
His first match with Samoa was in the match against Wales at Cardiff, on November 12, 1988, during the 1988 Western Samoa tour in Wales. He was part of the 1991 and 1995 World Cups. He also played for Japan twice in the 1993 Japan tour in Argentina and Wales, in the match against Wales on October 16, 1993. His last international match for Samoa was in a test match against Fiji at Suva, on July 20, 1996.

References

External links

Tupo Fa'amasino at New Zealand Rugby History

1966 births
Living people
Sportspeople from Apia
Samoan rugby union players
Samoan expatriate sportspeople in Japan
Rugby union centres
Samoa international rugby union players
Japan international rugby union players
Wellington rugby union players
Hurricanes (rugby union) players
Naturalized citizens of Japan
Samoan expatriate sportspeople in New Zealand
Samoan expatriate rugby union players
Expatriate rugby union players in Japan
Expatriate rugby union players in New Zealand